The Last Horror Film (a.k.a. Fanatic) is a 1982 American horror comedy film directed by David Winters and starring Joe Spinell and Caroline Munro. The director, David Winters, filmed on location at the Cannes Film Festival.

Plot

Vinny Durand (Joe Spinell) is a New York City taxi driver. He dreams of directing a film starring the actress Jana Bates (Caroline Munro), known as the "queen of horror films". Durand, who lives in an apartment with his mother (Filomena Spagnuolo), tells her that he is leaving to attend the Cannes Film Festival in France. He hopes to meet Bates and get her to star in his movie to kickstart his directing career. 

At Cannes, Bates is promoting her latest horror film Scream in which she has been nominated for Best Actress. Accompanying Jana is her manager and ex-husband Bret Bates (Glenn Jacobson), and the film's producer and boyfriend Alan Cunningham (Judd Hamilton). Durand tries to meet Bates, but is turned away. Durand phones Bret, only to find out agented scripts are accepted. Shortly afterwards, Bates is at a press conference with Cunningham when she receives flowers and a note saying, "You've made your last horror film. Goodbye." She goes to see Bret at his hotel room and finds he's been murdered. When she later returns with the police, the body is gone.

Durand continues following Bates around and filming her with his movie camera. Marty Bernestein runs into Vinny and shrugs him off when Vinny asks him if he is willing to promote his movie. Marty meets with the movie's director Stanley Kline, and his personal assistant Susan Archer, where they reveal that all of them have received the same notes that Jana and Bret received. But when Marty takes his suspicions to the police, they think that Bret's disappearance is another publicity stunt. The next day, Marty gets a letter from Bret to meet him in a theater screening room. When Bernestein shows up, he also is murdered.

While Jana attends more press conferences, Vinny goes to a nightclub where he attacks a stripper after seeing her as Jana. He goes to a local cinema where he watches a gory horror film of Stanley Kline, and runs into him outside the theater. The following day, Susan tells Stanley that she wants to leave Cannes, but he convinces her to stay a while longer. That evening, both of them are killed by the hooded figure atop a building where Stanley is stabbed, and she falls off the building's ledge after getting shot. The killer then takes his movie camera and films all the deaths.

Across town in Jana's hotel room, Vinny sneaks in with a bottle of champagne and surprises Jana as she is taking a shower. He asks her to appear in his movie, but she insists he leave immediately, causing Vinny to break down in tears. Angered and upset, Vinny smashes the bottle in the sink and threatens Jana with the bottle's jagged edge. When the doorbell rings, Jana shoves Vinny aside and sprints off. Jana, clad only in her bathroom towel, runs screaming through the hotel lobby being chased by Vinny. The people in the lobby think it is another publicity stunt and applaud. Vinny, caught off guard, stops and smiles for them, allowing Jana to escape, who runs into Alan and a group of reporters outside the hotel. After explaining what happened, Alan tells Jana that he will take her away from the city.

The next day, Alan drives Jana to a remote castle in the French countryside where a musician friend of his named Jonathan is staying. Vinny follows them. That evening, Vinny sneaks into the castle, but is chased away by Jana's bodyguards who accidentally kill Jonathan as he tries to stop Vinny.

Alan and Jana return to Cannes for the awards ceremony where Vinny sneaks into the festivities dressed as a local policeman. While Jana waits in the back wing of the building, Vinny subdues Jana with chloroform and takes the unconscious actress away in his car back to the castle to film a scene there. Vinny films a scene with him playing Dracula and Jana as a victim. Suddenly, Bret Bates shows up with another camera and a pistol, and congratulates Vinny on setting everything up for him. Bret is revealed to be the killer and the mastermind behind this whole thing, not Vinny. Bret reveals that on the day when Vinny phoned him about his movie proposal, he realized that he had the perfect fall guy to set Vinny up for all the killings and to get even with Jana for leaving him. Vinny throws his cape over Bret, distracting him, and runs. But Bret grabs Jana and taunts Vinny to come out in the open. Outside, Vinny turns on a motorcycle's headlights, blinding Bret, and as Jana steps aside, Vinny murders Bret with a chainsaw. As Alan arrives with the police, Vinny stands before Bret's dead body and screams.

The image falls back to reveal that the whole story is a movie that Vinny filmed at the Cannes Film Festival with Jana Bates, and he is now back in New York showing it to his mother in a screening room. His mother tells Vinny that she is finally proud of him for directing and starring in his first movie, but Vinny explains that it will be his last horror film. As Vinny starts to talk to his mother about ideas for his next movie, she interrupts him to ask for a joint. The two share a smoke as the film ends.

Cast
 Caroline Munro as Jana Bates
 Joe Spinell as Vinny Durand
 Judd Hamilton as Alan Cunningham
 Devin Goldenberg as Marty Bernstein
 David Winters as Stanley Kline
 Susanne Benton (credited as Stanley Susanne Benson) as Susan Archer
 Filomena Spagnuolo (credited as Mary Spinell) as Vinny's Mother
 Glenn Jacobson as Bret Bates

Reception

Accolades 

 Thomas F. Denove won the Clavell de Plata award for Best Cinematography at the 1982 Sitges.
 Date: July 30, 1983 Academy of Science Fiction, Fantasy & Horror Films, USA
Nominated: Saturn Award, Best International Film  
 Filomena Spagnuolo was nominated for the Academy of Science Fiction, Fantasy & Horror Films, Nominated: Saturn Award, Best Supporting Actress,
 Los Angeles Golden Scroll Award
 Paris Film Festival Award
 Festival Internacional de Cinema Fantàstic de Catalunya

Release
The completed movie was first shown on October 9, 1982 at the Sitges Film Festival in Barcelona, Spain. The film went on to win a slew of awards in various film festivals.

The film was released theatrically in the US, with Fanatic as its title, in July 1983. It was first released on home video in the USA on May 23, 1984 by Media Home Entertainment.

Feeling that the lack of a DVD release was unjust for such a cult classic, Troma re-released it in this format and later on Blu-ray, as part of their 'Tromasterpiece Collection'. The film is now under its original working title with hours of special features including interviews, commentaries, documentaries, and Spinell's unfinished Maniac 2.

References

External links

 

1982 films
1982 horror films
Troma Entertainment films
Cannes Film Festival
American slasher films
American serial killer films
Films set in castles
1980s slasher films
1980s English-language films
Films directed by David Winters
1980s American films